The 2011–12 season was Maccabi Haifa's 54th season in Israeli Premier League, and their 30th consecutive season in the top division of Israeli football.

This season is considered by Haifa as the "almost season". After winning the Israeli Premier League in the earlier season, the team started the season with qualification matches in the Champions League, but lost the last qualification match on penalties to the Belgian team Genk.
At the UEFA Europa League the team failed to qualify for the playoff level after losing the last game to Schalke from Germany, while FC Steaua București from Romania won their respective match, therefore qualifying ahead of Haifa.
Their Israeli Premier League campaign was one of their most disappointing seasons ever. Haifa wasn't one of the contenders for the title, and the last match ended as a draw, meaning the team did not qualify for the UEFA Europa League the followingseason.
At the State Cup the team lost to Hapoel Tel Aviv through a 93' minute goal.
This disappointing season caused the owner Ya'akov Shahar to appoint former player Reuven Atar as the manager for the next season instead of Elisha Levi.

UEFA Champions League

Qualification

Maccabi Haifa won 7–4 on aggregate.

Maccabi Haifa won 3–2 on aggregate.

3–3 on aggregate Genk won 4–1 on Penalties

UEFA Europa League

Group J

Ligat Ha'al

Regular season

Top playoff

Israel State Cup

Toto Cup

Squad statistics

External links
 Maccabi Haifa website

Maccabi Haifa F.C. seasons
Maccabi Haifa
Maccabi Haifa